The Ruffner House, also known as Luray Tannery Farm, is a historic home and farm complex located at Luray, Page County, Virginia. It was built in two phases, about 1825 and about 1851. It is a two-story, Federal / Greek Revival style brick dwelling with a hipped with deck roof, a stone foundation, and one-story porches on the two fronts. The house was remodeled in the 1920s. Also on the property are the contributing rambling two-story frame residence known as The Cottage; a stone spring house with attached brick pumphouse that served an adjacent tannery; schoolhouse and shop; root cellar; secondary barn; dairy; machinery shed; chicken house; a swimming pool; an 1890s bank barn, and the small Ruffner Cemetery.

It was listed on the National Register of Historic Places in 2002.

References

Houses on the National Register of Historic Places in Virginia
Farms on the National Register of Historic Places in Virginia
Federal architecture in Virginia
Greek Revival houses in Virginia
Houses completed in 1825
Houses in Page County, Virginia
National Register of Historic Places in Page County, Virginia
Ruffner family